Opus Cuatro are an Argentine folk vocal quartet founded in La Plata in 1968. The group debuted on 10 July 1968 and become one of the most important vocal groups in Latin America, staying active since then without interruption. At the beginning of 2009, the quartet had carried out 7,100 performances in 450 cities worldwide, including 25 tours in Europe and nine in the United States.

The founder members were Alberto Hassan (first tenor), Antonio Bugallo (second tenor), Lino Bugallo (baritone) and Federico Galiana (bass). Bugallo left the group in 1972, and was replaced first by Hannibal Bresca and then  Ruben Verna  until  Marcelo Balsells  was incorporated in 1982 and has remained ever since.

Discography 
América, 1970
Con América en la sangre, 1971
Si somos americanos, 1973
Opus Cuatro-Op. 4 - Vol IV, 1976
Opus Cuatro-CBS, 1980
Militantes de la vida, 1984
Un nuevo tiempo, 1987
Por amor, 1992
Jazz, spirituals, musicals, 1993
Opus Cuatro canta con los coros argentinos, 1994
No dejes de cantar, 1996
Opus Cuatro canta con los coros argentinos, volumen II, 1997
Milagro de amor, 1998
Opus Cuatro, se vuelve a más, 1999 (edición para Europa)
Cantata al Gral. Don José de San Martín, 1999, dirección musical de Luis María Serra
Opus Cuatro. Europa en vivo, 2000
Opus Cuatro, tangos, valses y milongas, 2001
Los opus y los vientos, 2003, con el grupo Cuatro Vientos (Julio Martínez, Jorge Polanuer, Diego Maurizi, Leo Heras)
Spirituals, blues & jazz, 2005
Opus Cuatro canta con los coros argentinos, volumen III, 2007
Latinoamérica vive, 2007, Radio Nederland
Opus Cuatro. Cuarenta años de canto, 2008

See more 
Argentine music

References 

Argentine musical groups